Rosa 'Hot Cocoa',  (aka WEKpaltlez), is a floribunda rose cultivar bred by Tom Carruth in 2002 and introduced into the United States by Weeks Roses Growers in 2003. The rose was named an All-America Rose Selections winner in 2003.

Description
'Hot Cocoa' is a medium-tall bushy shrub, 3 to 5 ft (91—151 cm) in height with a 2 to 3 ft (60—90 cm) spread. Blooms are medium-large,  4—5 in (10—12 cm) in diameter, with a high-centered, cupped, and ruffled bloom form. Petal count is typically 26 to 40. Flowers are russet colored with a darker reverse, and have variation of chocolate and orange colors. The rose has a medium, fruity fragrance and large, glossy, dark green foliage. 'Hot Cocoa' is a vigorous plant and disease resistant. It blooms in flushes from spring through fall. The plants does well in USDA zone 6 and warmer.

Child plants
'Hot Cocoa' was used to hybridize the following child plants:
 Rosa 'About Face', (2003)
 Rosa 'Coffee Bean', (2006)
 Rosa 'Coretta Scott King', (2012)

Awards 
 All-America Rose Selections (AARS) winner, USA, (2003)

See also
Garden roses
Rose Hall of Fame
List of Award of Garden Merit roses

References

 

Hot Cocoa